Hum Aapke Hain In Laws is a Hindi language fictional comedy series which premiered on 14 January 2013 on SAB TV. The series is produced by Garima Productions and stars Karan Grover and Pooja Pihal in the main leads. The story centers on a newly married couple who buy their dream home next to their In-laws and experience daily tensions.

Plot
Hum Aapke Hain In laws is all about the blessings and lessons, suggestions and tensions we get from our in-laws. The story revolves around Damini Grover and Gulshan Grover living in a semi-posh row-house society but in this society their neighbours are not just neighbours, they are their in-laws.

Cast
 Karan Grover as Gulshan Roshanlal Grover
 Pooja Pihal as Damini Sethi Grover
 Neev Ritesh Jain as Karan Grover
 Gopi Bhalla as Sher Singh
 Aasif Sheikh as Colonel Uddham Rai Sethi (U.R. Sethi)
 Rohitash Gaud as Pandit Roshanlal Grover
 Anup Upadhyay as Kewal Kumar Johar; Jolly 's husband, Colonel 's brother-in-law Fufaji
 Shreya More as Baby ji (Roshanlal's wife)
 Priyamvada Kant as Mithu Sethi, Colonel's younger daughter, Damini's sister

References

External links
Hum Aapke Hain In Laws Official Site on SAB TV
 

Sony SAB original programming
Indian comedy television series
Indian television sitcoms